Hamilton Douglas Halyburton (10 October 1763 – 31 December 1783) was a British Lieutenant who died at Sandy Hook, New Jersey.

Biography
He was born on 10 October 1763 to Sholto Douglas, 15th Earl of Morton. He was using it to chase deserters off of Sandy Hook. He and his crew were caught in a winter storm and they all died, all but one of the bodies washed ashore the next day. They were described as "12 gentlemen and one common sailor".

Halyburton Memorial
Katherine Hamilton, the Countess Dowager of Morton erected a monument, but it was destroyed by the French. The grave was rediscovered in 1908 during expansion of a road.

In 1937, a new Halyburton Memorial was constructed.

References

External links
 
 
 National Park Service: Sandy Hook-Halyburton Memorial-Grounds
 National Park Service: Sandy Hook-Halyburton Memorial-Marker 98

Royal Navy officers
1763 births
1783 deaths
Hamilton Douglas Halyburton
Hamilton
Younger sons of earls
New Jersey in the American Revolution
1783 in New Jersey
Sandy Hook, New Jersey
Deaths from hypothermia